Merlin Park Castle is a tower house and National Monument located in County Galway, Ireland.

Location

Merlinpark Castle is located 4 km (2½ mile) east-northeast of Galway city centre.

History
Merlinpark Castle was built for Tairrdelbach Ua Conchobair in the early 12th century.

It was owned by the Lynch (Ó Loingsigh) in the 16th century.  Still in good condition, it was lived in until the mid-19th century.

References

National Monuments in County Galway
Castles in County Galway